Agia Mavra is a village in the municipal unit of Tragano, Elis, Greece. It is situated in a flat, rural area, on the left bank of the river Pineios. It is 3km South of Tragano, 4km East of Kavasila, 2km Northwest of Roupaki, 2km Northeast of Koroivos, and 6km Northeast of Gastouni.

External links
GTP - Agia Mavra

See also

List of settlements in Elis

References

Populated places in Elis